The Madison County School District is a public school district in Madison County, Georgia, United States, based in Danielsville. In addition to Danielsville, the district also serves the cities of Carlton, Colbert, Comer, Hull, Ila.
Madison County public education is served by the Madison County School District. The Madison County Board of Education oversees and operates the public schools in the School District. Madison County Board of Education operates 5 elementary schools, 1 middle school, 1 high school and 1 career academy.

The Madison County Board of Education is overseen by 5 elected board members, from 5 districts in the county. The Board appoints a School Superintendent who works at the pleasure of the Board as a whole.
 District 1 - Robert Hooper (Nov 2007 - Dec 2018)
 District 2 - Angie McGinnis (Jan 2015 - Dec 2018)
 District 3 - Cindy Nash (Jan 2013 - Dec 2020)
 District 4 - Byron Lee (Jan 2017 - Dec 2020)
 District 5 - Brenda Moon (Jan 2017 - Dec 2020)
School Superintendent - Mr. Michael Williams (since May 2018)

Schools
The Madison County School District has five elementary schools, one middle school, and one high school.

School resource officers are stationed within each of the schools, provided by the Madison County Sheriff’s Office in cooperation with the Madison County School District.

Elementary schools
Colbert Elementary School                    Principal- James Fahrney,                         Assistant Principal- Maggie Cowne              SRO- Deputy Rick Carter
Comer Elementary School                      Principal- Dr. Amanda Sailors,                Assistant Principal- Stephanie Dickens,      SRO- Deputy Sarah Williams
Danielsville Elementary School             Principal- Deana Bray,                              Assistant Principal- Breanne Smith,              SRO- Deputy Sharon Chapman
Hull-Sanford Elementary School           Principal- Theresa Bettis,                        Assistant Principal- Sara Bailey,                    SRO- Deputy Ken Vaughn
Ila Elementary School                            Principal- Missy Andrews,                       Assistant Principal- Jerry King,                      SRO- Corporal Josie Weaver

Middle school
Madison County Middle School Principal- Georgie Bullock; Assistant Principals- Britt Beaver, Jeremy Waller, Doug Wood; SRO- Lieutenant Brandon Moss

High school
Madison County High School Principal-  Johnathan Harris; Assistant Principals- Matt Berryman,  Anne Poss, Nate Webster; Athletic Director- Mike Haynes; SRO- Sergeant Taylor Arrendale
Broad River College and Career Academy CEO- Dr. Paul (Bo) Boykin

References
 4. ^https://www.madison.k12.ga.us/

External links

School districts in Georgia (U.S. state)
Education in Madison County, Georgia